Inge Lindholm (June 22, 1892 – May 24, 1932) was a Swedish track and field athlete who competed in the 1912 Summer Olympics. In 1912 he finished twelfth in the triple jump competition. He also participated in the pentathlon competition. Being in eighth place after four events he did not finish the final 1500 m run.

References

External links
profile 

1892 births
1932 deaths
Swedish male triple jumpers
Swedish pentathletes
Olympic athletes of Sweden
Athletes (track and field) at the 1912 Summer Olympics